Rusatai-ye Khan Baba Ahmadi (also Romanized as Rūsatāī-ye Khān Bābā Aḩmadī) is a village in Kongor Rural District, in the Central District of Kalaleh County, Golestan Province, Iran. At the 2006 census, its population was 69, in 14 families.

References 

Populated places in Kalaleh County